Political Process and the Development of the Black Insurgency, 1930–1970 is a 1982 book by the sociologist Doug McAdam (published by the University of Chicago Press). The book details the rise and fall of the American Civil Rights Movement by looking at it through the paradigm of the opportunities available via the established political structure, and more specifically the opportunity for social movement groups to make successful claims of grievances. 

1982 non-fiction books
History of African-American civil rights
Sociology books